The Ombudsman of the Philippines, also known as Tanodbayan ng Pilipinas, is an ombudsman responsible for investigating and prosecuting Philippine government officials accused of crimes, especially graft and corruption.

Functions
Under the 1987 Philippine Constitution and the Ombudsman Act of 1989, the Office of the Ombudsman independently monitors all three branches of the government for political corruption. The Ombudsman "is principally tasked to investigate on its own or upon complaint by any person, in any form or manner, any act or omission of any public officer or employee, including those in government-owned or controlled corporations, which appears to be illegal, unjust, improper or inefficient." After an investigation, the Ombudsman files charges at the Sandiganbayan, a special anti-graft court.

The Offices of the Ombudsman includes the Ombudsman's own office, along with offices for a team composed of a Sheriff, the Ombudsman's second in command, and six other deputies who lead their respective divisions or bureaus.

History
The Office of the Ombudsman predates the 1987 Constitution. There have been several offices established under various presidents of the Philippines whose duties are now subsumed under the Office of the Ombudsman. President Elpidio Quirino established the Integrity Board in 1950; President Ramon Magsaysay, the Presidential Complaints and Action Commission in 1957; President Carlos P. Garcia, the Presidential Committee on Administration Performance Efficiency in 1958; President Diosdado Macapagal, the Presidential Anti-Graft Committee in 1962; and finally President Ferdinand Marcos, the Presidential Agency on Reform and Government Operations in 1966.

In 1969, the Office of the Citizens Counselor was created by the Republic Act No. 6028. It was primarily designed to conduct fact-finding investigations and make recommendations to Congress and the President. The office was "not at all implemented." Subsequently, Marcos created the Complaints and Investigation Office in 1970 and the Presidential Administrative Assistance Committee in 1971. None of these were successful nor were independent.

In the martial law-era 1973 Philippine Constitution (Sections 5 and 6, Article XIII), provided for the establishment of a special court called the Sandiganbayan and an office of the ombudsman called the Tanodbayan. On June 11, 1978, during martial law, the late dictator President Ferdinand Marcos created by presidential decree the office of the Tanodbayan. The Tanodbayan was not independent but served at the pleasure of the president and could be removed at any time.

After Marcos was overthrown in the 1986 People Power Revolution, President Corazon Aquino issued two Executive Orders (nos. 243 and 244) in July 1987 that established a new Office of the Ombudsman and transformed the Tanodbayan into the Office of the Special Prosecutor under the Ombudsman. Following the passage of the 1987 Constitution, the Ombudsman Act of 1989 was passed to define the roles and structure of the Office.

Officials
The Ombudsman and its subordinates are appointed by the President of the Philippines from a list submitted by the Judicial and Bar Council for a nonrenewable seven-year term. The Ombudsman can be removed from office only through impeachment.

List

See also
Political history of the Philippines
Vice President of the Philippines
Supreme Court of the Philippines
President of the Philippines
House of Representatives of the Philippines
Senate of the Philippines
Constitution of the Philippines
Congress of the Philippines
Executive Departments of the Philippines

References

External links

Office of the Ombudsman Official Website

Government of the Philippines
Ombudsman
Philippines, Ombudsman